Rajgir–Bakhtiyarpur DEMU was a Passenger express train of the Indian Railways connecting  in Bihar and  in Bihar. It was cancelled on 16 November 2017. It was operated with 53229/53230 train numbers on daily basis.

Route and halts

Average speed and frequency
The train ran with an average speed of 22 km/h and completed 54 km in 2 hrs 25 min. The train ran twice a day.

See also 
 Rajgir railway station
 Bakhtiyarpur Junction railway station

References

External links 
73253/Rajgir-Bakhtiyarpur DEMU
73254/Bakhtiyarpur-Rajgir DEMU

Rail transport in Bihar
Diesel–electric multiple units of India